Ancient Title (April 19, 1970 – September 1, 1981) was an American Thoroughbred Hall of Fame racehorse.

Background
Foaled in California, he was bred by William and Ethel Kirkland and raced under Ethel Kirkland's name following her husband's death in 1972. She too died in 1976 and the horse then competed under the Kirkland Stable banner. Ancient was gelded before age three because of a very difficult disposition,

Racing career
Ancient Title raced for seven years. He won many of the top Graded stakes races in California and was twice voted California Horse of the Year. Trained by Keith Stucki, Ancient Title began winning at age two with his most important victory coming in the 1972 California Breeders' Champion Stakes. He continued winning at age three but began to develop into a top level horse in 1974. That year, he became only the third horse to ever win all three races in the Strub Series. In addition to the Los Angeles and Palos Verdes Handicaps, he ran second to Prince Dantan in the Santa Anita Handicap and second to Tree Of Knowledge in the Hollywood Gold Cup. His 1974 performances earned him the first of two consecutive California Horse of the Year honors.

In 1975, Ancient Title's wins included the Californian Stakes, the San Carlos Handicap and the Hollywood Gold Cup. That year his handlers also brought him to race on the East Coast where he won the Whitney Handicap at New York's  Saratoga Race Course and ran third to winner Wajima and runner-up Forego in the Marlboro Cup Invitational Handicap at Belmont Park. Ancient Title won more California stakes races in 1977 and after competing and winning in 1978 an injury led to his retirement. With earnings of $1,252,791, he ended his racing career as the richest California-bred horse to that time.

Retirement
For three years, Ancient Title lived in retirement at Rio Vista Farm near Atascadero, California operated by trainer Wallace Dollase. He reportedly died following surgery for colic problems on September 1, 1981.

Honors
In 1985, the Oak Tree Racing Association honored the horse with the creation of the Ancient Title Handicap at Santa Anita Park.

On August 4, 2008, Ancient Title was only the fifth California bred inducted into the National Museum of Racing and Hall of Fame.

References
 Ancient Title's pedigree and partial racing stats

1970 racehorse births
1981 racehorse deaths
Racehorses bred in California
Racehorses trained in the United States
American Grade 1 Stakes winners
United States Thoroughbred Racing Hall of Fame inductees
Thoroughbred family 8-f